The Maygñaway River is a river on the island of Catanduanes in the Philippines. It drains into the Philippine Sea.

References

Rivers of the Philippines